"Welcome to the Club" is the second episode of the sixth season of the post-apocalyptic horror television series Fear the Walking Dead, which aired on AMC on October 18, 2020, in the United States.

This episode was directed by Lennie James who plays Morgan Jones in his directorial debut. It also marks the first appearance of new series regular Zoe Colleti as Dakota.

Plot 
Strand and Alicia are working with Virginia to clean up waste from the community. Marcus begins to harass Strand and Alicia but is reprimanded by Dakota, Virginia's younger sister.

Virginia sends Alicia and Strand to a warehouse full of walkers covered in sticky molasses as a punishment where she tests them. Charlie also appears in the warehouse who was punished for trying to escape from the warehouse. Sanjay, a prisoner who already experienced the deaths of his companions and several pioneers, arrives to the warehouse. Suddenly, Dakota appears to help them escape from the warehouse, causing the death of two pioneers who tried to capture her and take her to Virginia. Strand murders Sanjay for being a coward and together with Alicia, Janis, and Charlie, they manage to successfully subdue the walkers.

Later, Virginia praises Strand for his work of eliminating the walkers from the warehouse and gives him a key and a very important position for the community. Strand sends Alicia elsewhere and says goodbye to her. Strand tries to convince Daniel about his true self but he ignores him again. Daniel leaves the community and is attacked by a walker, when he is suddenly saved by a mysterious man who reveals himself to be Morgan Jones.

Reception

Critical response 
David S.E. Zapanta of Den of Geek! rated the episode 4.5/5, writing: "This may be James's directorial debut, but he nonetheless delivers one of Fear's strongest episodes."

Ratings 
The episode was seen by 1.55 million viewers in the United States on its original air date, lower than the previous episodes.

References

External links

 "Welcome to the Club" at AMC.com
 

2020 American television episodes
Fear the Walking Dead (season 6) episodes